Acompsia bidzilyai is a moth of the family Gelechiidae. It is found in Transbaikalia in Russia.

The forewings are light greyish brown and the hindwings are grey. Adults have been recorded in July.

Etymology
The species is named for Dr. Oleksiy Bidzilya.

References

Moths described in 2002
Endemic fauna of Russia
Moths of Asia
Acompsia